Magneuptychia fugitiva is a species of butterfly of the family Nymphalidae. It is found in Suriname.

References

Butterflies described in 1997
Euptychiina
Nymphalidae of South America